Primarosa Rinaldi de Chieri is an Italian-Argentine geneticist and physician. In 1965, she obtained her medical degree, from the Faculty of Medicine at the University of Buenos Aires. In 1978, she received a doctorate from the same university. She is a consultant and lecturer in genetics and serves as First Chair at the pediatrics department of UBA. She is also a director of the laboratory of genetic analysis at Primagen.

Membership 
 Sociedad Argentina de Genética Médica. Miembro Fundador. 1969
 Sociedad Argentina de Obstetricia y Ginecología de Buenos Aires. Miembro Titular. 1979
 Sociedad Argentina de Mujeres Médicas (A.M.A.)
 Asociación Médica Argentina (Professor Extranjero de la Escuela de Graduados). Miembro Honorario Nacional. 1990
 Organización Nacional de Mujeres Italo Argentinas. 1991
 The American Society of Human Genetics. Miembro titular. 1992
 Ibero-American Society of Human Genetics of North America. Miembro Titular. 1993
 Asociación Argentina de Perinatología. Miembro Titular. 1993.
 Sociedad Iberoamericana de Diagnóstico Prenatal. Barcelona, España. Vicepresidenta del Comité de Citogenética.
 Miembro del Consejo Científico Internacional de la Revista Diagnóstico Prenatal 1994
 International Society of Forensic Genetics. Miembro titular. 1997
 Grupo Español y Portugués de la ISFG (GEP – ISFG) Miembro titular. 1997
 Sociedad Argentina de Genética Forense. Socio fundador. 2000
 Sociedad Argentina de Veterinaria. Socio activo. 2002
 International Society Animal Genetics (ISAG) Miembro titular. 2002

Awards 

 1979 – "Alberto Peralta Ramos". Academia Nacional de Medicina: "Diagnóstico Prenatal de los Desórdenes Genéticos II"
 1987 – II Congreso Argentino de Perinatología: Cordocentesis: técnica, indicaciones actuales y resultados"
 1989 – Asociación Médica Argentina. Premio Distinción por libro publicado por Editorial "López": "Genética Clínica". "Diagnóstico y Prevención de las enfermedades genéticas"
 1991 – Asociación Médica Argentina. Premio "Aniceto López, mejor trabajo sobre Actualización Médica: "Investigación del Síndrome XYY en la Argentina"
 1995 – Asociación Médica Argentina (A.M.A.) Premio “Sertal” Monografía: “Fisiopatología de las enfermedades genéticas ”
 1996 – IV Curso Internacional de Pediatría. Fundación Cátedra de Pediatría. Premio: “Juan P. Garrahan”: “Aplicación de la Genética Molecular en la Patología Pediátrica”
 1998 – Ier Congreso Internacional de Medicina Legal y Ciencias Forenses de la República Argentina. Premio: "Premio Congreso": "Aspectos genéticos y psiquiátricos en la filiación controvertida". Con Dra. Patricia Chieri

Selected works 
 Chieri, Primarosa. 1988. Genética médica para el consultorio. Buenos Aires, República Argentina: Inter-Médica. (in Spanish)
 Chieri, Primarosa, and Eduardo A. Zannoni. 2001. Prueba del ADN. Ciudad de Buenos Aires: Editorial Astrea de Alfredo y Ricardo Depalma.  (in Spanish)
 Chieri, Primarosa, Ricardo A. Basílico, and Ángel Carracedo. 2014. El ADN en criminalística. (in Spanish)

References 

1943 births
Living people
Argentine women physicians
Italian emigrants to Argentina
Italian women physicians
Academic staff of the University of Buenos Aires
University of Buenos Aires alumni
Women geneticists